This is a list of compositions by Vincent d'Indy.

Works with opus number

Op. 1, Piano Sonata in C minor (1869)
Op. 2, La chanson des aventuriers de la mer for male voices, piano, and string quintet after Victor Hugo (1872)
Op. 3, Attente, song for voice and piano after Hugo (1871)
Op. 4, Madrigal, song for voice and piano after Robert de Bonnières (1872)
Op. 5, Jean Hundaye, symphony (1874-5) [cf. John Hunyadi] (rejected by composer)
Op. 6, Antoine et Cléopâtre, overture after William Shakespeare (1876)
Op. 7, Piano Quartet in A minor (1878–88)
Op. 8, La Forêt enchantée (Harald), symphonic legend after Uhland (1878)
Op. 9, Petite sonate dans la forme classique for piano (1880)
Op. 10, Plainte de Thécla, song after de Bonnières and Friedrich Schiller (1880)
Op. 11, Au galop (Melodie espagnole), song after de Bonnières (1876-9)
Op. 12, Wallenstein, three symphonic overtures after Schiller's Wallenstein (1870–81)
No. 1 Le camp
No. 2 Les piccolomini
No. 3 La mort de Wallenstein
Op. 13, Clair de lune, song for soprano and piano after Victor Hugo (1872), orch. (1881)
Op. 14, Attendez-moi sous l'orme, opéra-comique in one act after J. Prével (1876–82)
Op. 15, Poème des montagnes, symphonic poem for piano (1881)
Op. 16, Quatre pièces for piano (1882)
Op. 17, Helvétia, three waltzes for piano (1882)
Op. 18, Le chant de la cloche, legend dramatique with prologue and seven scenes, text by d'Indy after Schiller, for solo voices, double chorus, and orchestra (1879–83), also adapted for stage
Op. 19, Lied for cello/viola and orchestra (1884)
Op. 20, L'amour et la crane, song for voice and piano after Charles Baudelaire (1884)
Op. 21, Saugefleurie, legend for orchestra after de Bonnières (1884)
Op. 22, Cantate Domino, canticle for three voices and organ (1885)
Op. 23, Sainte Marie-Madeleine, cantata for soprano, female voices, piano, and harmonium (1885)
Op. 24, Suite dans le style ancien in D for trumpet, two flutes, and string quartet with Bass ad libitum (1886)
Op. 25, Symphonie sur un chant montagnard français (Symphonie cévenole) for piano and orchestra (1886)
Op. 26, Nocturne for piano (1886)
Op. 27, Promenade for piano (1887)
Op. 28, Sérénade et valse for orchestra (1885)
Op. 29, Trio in B flat for clarinet/violin, cello, and piano (1887)
Op. 30, Schumanniana, three songs without words for piano (1887)
Op. 31, Fantaisie sur des thèmes populaires français for oboe and orchestra (1888)
Op. 32, Sur la mer, for female voices (1888)
Op. 33, Tableaux de voyage, thirteen pieces for piano (1889)
Op. 34, Karadec, incidental music after A. Alexandre (1890)
Op. 35, String Quartet No. 1 in D (1890)
Op. 36, Tableaux de voyage (orch. 1892 after piano works Op. 33/1. 2. 5. 4, 6, 13)
Op. 37, Cantate de fête pour l'inauguration d'une statue for baritone, voices, and orchestra after E. Augier (1893)
Op. 38, Prélude et petit canon à trois parties for organ (1893)
Op. 39, L'art et le peuple, for four male voices after Hugo (1894), orch. (1918)
Op. 40, Fervaal, action musicale with prologue and three acts (1889–93)
Op. 41, Deus Israel conjungat vos, motet for four to six voices (1896)
Op. 42, Istar, symphonic variations (1896)
Op. 43, Lied maritime, song for voice and piano (1896)
Op. 44, Ode à Valence, for soprano, male voices, and orchestra after Genest (1897)
Op. 45, String Quartet No. 2 in E (1897)
Op. 46, Les noces d'or du sacerdoce, canticle for voice and harmonium after P. Delaporte (1898)
Op. 47, Médée, incidental music after C. Mendès (1898)
Op. 48, La première dent, song for voice and piano after J. de La Laurencie (1898)
Op. 49, Sancta Maria, succure miseris, motet for two equal voices and organ (1898)
Op. 50, Chansons et danses for wind instruments (1898)
Op. 51, Vêpres du commun des martyrs for organ (1899)
Op. 52, Quatre-vingt-huit chansons populaires du Vivarais (1900)
Op. 53, L'étranger, action musicale in two acts (1898–1901)
Op. 54, Marche du 76ème régiment d'infanterie for military band (1903)
Op. 55, Choral varié, for saxophone/viola and orchestra (1903)
Op. 56, Mirage, song for voice and piano after P. Gravollet (1903)
Op. 57, Symphony No. 2 in B flat (1902-3)
Op. 58, Les yeux de l'aimée, song for voice and piano (1904)
Op. 59, Violin Sonata in C (1903-4)
Op. 60, Petite chanson grégorienne for piano four hands (1904)
Op. 61, Jour d'été à la montagne, symphonic triptych (1905)
Op. 62, Souvenirs, poem for orchestra (1906)
Op. 63, Piano Sonata in E (1907)
Op. 64, Vocalise, song for voice and piano (1907)
Op. 65, Menuet sur le nom de Haydn for piano (1909)
Op. 66, Pièce in E flat for harmonium (1911), pub. for organ (1912) and as Prélude (1913)
Op. 67, La légende de Saint Christophe, drame sacré in three acts (1908–15), libretto by d'Indy after J. de Voragine's Legende aurea
Op. 68, Treize pièces brèves for piano (1908–15)
Op. 69, Douze pièces brèves faciles dans le style classique de la fin du XVIIIe siècle for piano (1908–15)
Op. 70, Symphony No. 3 Sinfonia brevis de bello gallico (1916–18)
Op. 71, Cent thèmes d'harmonie et réalisations (1907–18)
Op. 72, Sarabande et menuet for wind quintet and piano (1918), arr. from Op. 24
Op. 73, Sept chants de terroir for piano four hands (1918)
Op. 74, Pour les enfants de tous les âges, twenty-four pieces for piano (1919)
Op. 75, Pentecosten, twenty-four popular Gregorian canticles, for voice, union voices, and organ (1919)
Op. 76, Veronica, incidental music after C. Gos (1919–20)
Op. 77, Poèmes des rivages, symphonic suite (1919–21)
Op. 78, Two Scholars' Songs for two voices after anon. (1921)
Op. 79, Ave, regina coelorum, motet for four voices (1922)
Op. 80, Le rêve de Cinyras, comédie musicale in three acts after X. de Courville (1922)
Op. 81, Piano Quintet in G minor (1924)
Op. 82, Trois chansons populaires françaises for four voices (1924)
Op. 83, Deux motets en l'honneur de la canonisation de Saint Jean Eudes for four voices (1925)
Op. 84, Cello Sonata in D (1924-5)
Op. 85, Thème varié, fugue and chorale for piano (1925)
Op. 86, Contes de fées, five pieces for piano (1925)
Op. 87, Diptyque méditerranéen for orchestra (1925-6)
Op. 88, O dominea mea, motet for two equal voices and organ (1926)
Op. 89, Concert for piano, flute and cello with string orchestra (1926)
Op. 90, Six chants populaires français (1927)
Op. 91, Suite for flute, string trio, and harp (1927)
Op. 92, Sextet in B flat for two violins, two violas, and two cellos (1927)
Op. 93, Le bouquet de printemps for three female voices after anon. (1928)
Op. 94, Madrigal à deux voix, song for soprano and cello after Charles d'Orléans (1928)
Op. 95, Six paraphrases sur des chansons enfantines de France (1928)
Op. 96, String Quartet No. 3 in D flat (1928-9)
Op. 97, Les trois fileuses, for three equal voices after M. Chevais (1929)
Op. 98, Piano Trio in G (1929)
Op. 99, Fantaisie sur un vieil air de ronde française for piano (1930)
Op. 100, Six chants populaires français for four voices (1930)
Op. 101, Cinquante chansons populaires du Vivarais (1930)
Op. 102, Chanson en forme de canon à l'octave for soprano and baritone (1931)
Op. 103, Chant de nourrice for three equal voices after J. Aicard (1931)
Op. 104, Le forgeron for three voices and string quartet after Aicard (1931)
Op. 105, La vengeance du mari for soprano and two tenors, four voices, and small wind band/piano (1931), pub. as Op. 104

Works without opus number
Orchestral
Symphony No. 1 in A Symphonie italienne (1870–72)
La divine comédie, symphonic poem after Dante (1871)

Chamber
Scherzo in D for piano quartet (1871)
Mosaïque sur Fervaal for military band (1897)
Trois petites pièces (1907–15)
No. 1 in D for flute and piano
No. 2 in B flat for clarinet and piano
No. 3 in F for horn and piano
Rondino for four trumpets (1911)
String Quartet No.4 (1931, incomplete)

Piano
Quatre romances sans paroles (1870)

Secular vocal
O gai soleil for two voices (1909)
Vive Henry quatre for four voices and wind band/piano (1909), harmonization of song by anon.

Songs for voice and piano
L'Académie Française nous a nommés tous trois, authorship of lyrics doubtful, possibly d'Indy (1888)
Vingt-neuf chansons populaires du Vivarais et du Vercors (1892)
Deux chansons enfantines (1896)
Six chansons anciennes du Vivarais (1926)
Ariette pour Tina (1927)
Cinq chansons folkloriques et deux rigaudons à une voix (c. 1931)

References

Adapted from Andrew Thomson and Robert Orledge, 'Vincent d'Indy', The New Grove Dictionary of Music and Musicians, ed. S. Sadie and J. Tyrrell (London: Macmillan, 2001)

Indy, Vincent d', compositions by